Snowboarding at the 2011 European Youth Winter Olympic Festival was held from 13 to 17 February 2011. It was held at the Snowboard Venue at Kořenov, Czech Republic.

Results

Medal table

Men's events

Women's events

References 

Snowboarding
2011 in snowboarding
2011